Erik Møse (born 9 October 1950) is a Norwegian judge. Møse has been a judge at the International Criminal Tribunal for Rwanda (ICTR), Supreme Court of Norway, and the European Court of Human Rights (ECHR). At the ICTR, he served as Vice President and later President. Having retired from his judicial career, he is currently serving as Chair of the Independent International Commission of Inquiry on Ukraine.

Education and early career
Møse graduated from the University of Oslo and had post-graduate studies at the Graduate Institute of International Studies in Geneva. Beginning in 1981, he taught at the University of Oslo. He then became a Fellow at the University of Essex in England and subsequently an Honorary Doctor.

Human rights expert
Møse has published extensively in the field of human rights. He led the committee that published the Norwegian Official Report 1993:18 on human rights.

Møse was head of department in the Norwegian Ministry of Justice and the Police until 1986; deputy judge, Supreme Court advocate at the Solicitor General's Office from 1986 to 1993; and presiding judge at Borgarting Court of Appeal in Oslo from 1993 to 1999.

Møse became Vice President of the International Criminal Tribunal for Rwanda (ICTR) in 1999, then President in 2003, succeeding Navanethem Pillay.

Møse was President of the ICTR from 2003 to 2007. , he was the Presiding Judge in Trial Chamber I of the ICTR.

In 2008 he was named as a Supreme Court Justice of Norway. In 2011 he was elected judge at the European Court of Human Rights. He resumed his Supreme Court chair in 2018.

Personal life
Møse is married and has two children, who both attended International School Moshi Arusha Campus and International School Moshi.

References

1950 births
Living people
University of Oslo alumni
Academic staff of the University of Oslo
Graduate Institute of International and Development Studies alumni
Norwegian legal scholars
Academics of the University of Essex
Presidents of the International Criminal Tribunal for Rwanda
Supreme Court of Norway justices
Judges of the European Court of Human Rights
Norwegian officials of the United Nations
Norwegian judges of United Nations courts and tribunals
Norwegian judges of international courts and tribunals